The Mpassa River is a tributary of the Ogooue River.

It flows in Gabon, and passes through Franceville. Its main tributary is the Ndjoumou River. The Mpassa River rises in the Bateke Plateau near the border with the Republic of the Congo.

References 

 National Geographic. 2003. African Adventure Atlas Pg 24,72. led by Sean Fraser.
 Lerique Jacques. 1983. Hydrographie-Hydrologie. in Geographie et Cartographie du Gabon, Atlas Illustré led by The Ministère de l'Education Nationale de la Republique Gabonaise. Pg 14–15. Paris, France: Edicef

Bibliography 
Maria Petringa, Brazza, A Life for Africa. Bloomington, IN: AuthorHouse, 2006. 

Rivers of Gabon